Elmer Antonio Mejía Rodríguez (born 23 June 1978, Comayagua, Honduras) is a retired Nicaraguan footballer who last played for Real Esteli in the Nicaraguan Primera División.

Club career
Mejía played for F.C. Motagua, with whom he won the 2001 Apertura, before moving abroad to become captain of Nicaraguan side Real Estelí. By 2012, Mejía had scored 100 goals for Estelí after winning the league's top goalscorer award with 14 goals. In 2007/08 he amassed 33 goals.

International career
Mejía made his debut for Honduras in a July 2001 friendly match against Ecuador, which proved to be his sole international match.

Honours

Titles

References

External links

 Profile - Real Estelí
 

1978 births
Living people
People from Comayagua
Association football midfielders
Honduran men's footballers
Honduras international footballers
Nicaraguan men's footballers
Nicaragua international footballers
F.C. Motagua players
Real Estelí F.C. players
Liga Nacional de Fútbol Profesional de Honduras players
Dual internationalists (football)
2014 Copa Centroamericana players